Fidelitas (Latin, 'fidelity, faithfulness') may refer to:

 Fidelitas (Hungary), the youth organization of the conservative Fidesz party
 Fidélitas University, a private university in Costa Rica
 FC Fidelitas Karlsruhe, an early German football club
 , an Italian World War II steamer

See also